Acidaliastis is a genus of moths in the family Geometridae erected by George Hampson in 1896.

Species
Acidaliastis bicurvifera Prout, 1916
Acidaliastis curvilinea Prout, 1912
Acidaliastis curvilinea ssp. mixta Prout, 1930
Acidaliastis micra Hampson, 1896
Acidaliastis micra ssp. galactea Rungs, 1942
Acidaliastis porphyretica Prout, 1925
Acidaliastis prophanes Prout, 1922
Acidaliastis subbrunnescens Prout, 1916
Acidaliastis systena Fletcher, 1978

References

Microloxiini
Geometridae genera